Cirrochroa eremita is a species of butterfly of the family Nymphalidae. It was described by Etsuzo Tsukada in 1985. It is found on northern Sulawesi.

References 

Vagrantini
Butterflies described in 1985